John Rackham may refer to:

 Calico Jack (1682–1720), English pirate captain John Rackham operating in the Caribbean
 John T. Phillifent (1916–1976), British science fiction writer, used pseudonym John Rackham